Middle Brighton railway station is located on the Sandringham line in Victoria, Australia. It serves the south-eastern Melbourne suburb of Brighton, and it opened on 21 December 1861 as Church Street. It was renamed Middle Brighton on 1 January 1867.

History

Middle Brighton station opened on 21 December 1861, when the railway line from North Brighton was extended to Brighton Beach.

In 1926, a crossover located between both platforms was abolished. In 1942, a siding was removed.

In 1963, boom barriers replaced interlocked gates at the Church Street level crossing, located at the Down end of the station. The signal box that protected the level crossing was also abolished during this time.

Platforms and services

Middle Brighton has two side platforms. It is serviced by Metro Trains' Sandringham line services.

On weekdays, two early morning services originate from Middle Brighton. These services are formed by empty trains directly from the stabling yard at Brighton Beach.

Platform 1:
  all stations services to Flinders Street

Platform 2:
  all stations services to Sandringham

Transport links

CDC Melbourne operates one route to and from Middle Brighton station, under contract to Public Transport Victoria:
 : to Chadstone Shopping Centre

Kinetic Melbourne operates one route via Middle Brighton station, under contract to Public Transport Victoria:
 : Westfield Southland – St Kilda station

Ventura Bus Lines operates three routes via Middle Brighton station, under contract to Public Transport Victoria:
  : to Blackburn station
 : Dandenong station – Brighton
 : Dandenong station – Brighton

References

External links
 Melway map at street-directory.com.au

Railway stations in Melbourne
Railway stations in Australia opened in 1861
Railway stations in the City of Bayside